

The Caudron C.230  was a sporting, touring and trainer aircraft produced in France in 1930. It was a conventional biplane with single-bay, unstaggered wings of equal span. The pilot and a single passenger sat in tandem open cockpits. It featured a wooden fuselage with plywood skin.

Fifteen examples were produced before the much improved and very successful Caudron C.270 Luciole series appeared.

Variants
Data from:
 C.230 - first production version with Salmson 7Ac radial engine (15 built)
 C.232 - version with Renault 4Pb engine (50 built)
 C.232/2 - as C.232 with wheel brakes (3 built)
 C.232/4 - as C.232/2 with improved equipment (7 built)
 C.233 - prototype for testing of Michel AM-16 engine, later re-engined with Salmson 7Ac, reverting to C.230 designation. (1 built)
 C.235 - version with Argus As 8R engine for French Air Ministry (Ministere de l'Air) tests (1 built)

Specifications (C.232)

References

External links

All-Aero C.230

1930s French sport aircraft
C.230
Single-engined tractor aircraft
Biplanes
Aircraft first flown in 1930